{{Infobox game
| name = Kingdom Death: Monster
| AKA = KDM, KD:M
| italic title = yes
| image = File:Kingdom death monster logo.jpg
| image_alt = Kingdom Death: Monster rulebook cover image
| caption = The cover image from Kingdom Death: Monsters hardcover rulebook (versions 1.5+)
| publisher = Adam Poots Games LLC
| designer = Adam Poots
| date = 
| genre = Miniature wargaming
| players = 
| setup_time = 
| playing_time = 
| random_chance = Moderate to high (order of cards drawn, varying card outcomes, dice rolling)
| skills = Strategic thinking, miniature painting
| ages = 17+
| website = 
}}Kingdom Death: Monster is a cooperative board game created by Adam Poots and released in 2015. 

 Gameplay 

Kingdom Death: Monster is a strategy board game designed to be played by four players who take on the role of adventurers having barely survived an attack by a monstrous lion. Forming a settlement, they celebrate their victory with a yearly lantern festival followed by a ceremonial hunt against another monster. The game is a story-driven campaign that takes place over approximately 30 of these "lantern years". Most lantern years are divided into three phases: the hunt, the showdown, and the settlement phase. A complete game is estimated to take about 60 play hours to complete, with the game designed in a manner that allows the current state of the game after completing any of the above phases to be easily recorded and resumed in a subsequent play session in which players may also be swapped.

One persistent element across all rounds are the player-characters that live in the settlement, which are created at the onset of the game or from other in-game events, and can die from the Showdown phase or numerous other actions. Each character has a set of attributes, including those typical of a tabletop role-playing game for combat such as strength and evasion, and measures of the character's courage and understanding. Characters have an Insanity attribute, representing how mentally unstable the character is; while this can force the character to perform irrational actions on certain events, Insanity also helps to protect the character from the horrors of the game's world. Characters also have a number of Survival points, which are generally spent if the player wishes to avoid taking certain types of damage or to gain an advantage. During the game, characters can also gain permanent injuries that affect their attributes or ability to participate in certain events, as well as disorders that also have impacts on attributes and abilities during certain phases of the game. All these attributes are recorded and persist between game sessions.

 Hunt phase 
In the Hunt Phase, the players select a quarry to hunt, and at which level; a higher-level quarry will be more deadly and difficult to slay, but more rewards will be gained for defeating it. They then set up a series of randomly-drawn event cards, both generic and those tied to the specific monster on marked spaces along a linear game board, along with playing their character figures and the monster's on specific spaces as instructed by the game's manual. The players then progress through these cards, moving their characters one space, flipping the card on the space, following the instructions and making any choices that the instructions require. These might cause characters to be damaged before the hunt, to encounter the monster earlier or later than expected, or grant other gains or losses prior to the showdown. When the characters move onto the space with the monster, or if the monster should be moved into their space, the Showdown Phase begins.

In certain Lantern Years, as directed by Settlement events, players may be forced to encounter a Nemesis creature. In these cases, there is no Hunt phase and the game proceeds immediately to the Showdown phase.

 Showdown phase 
In the Showdown Phase, the players face off against the monster in a manner typical of most tabletop role-playing games. Each monster has a unique deck of AI (artificial intelligence) and Hit Location cards; prior to showdown, players draw a select number of AI cards to create the deck for the monster for that showdown. The number of cards in the AI deck is generally equivalent to the monster's health; wounding the monster usually removes an AI card from this deck. Each Showdown also has the players populate the game board with terrain tiles that can impact movement or provide cover.  

The Showdown Phase is divided into rounds, with most rounds beginning with the monster's turn. Control of the monster passes between players after each round, and while in most cases the player will follow the instructions given on cards and make dice rolls, the controlling player may also need to make decisions for the monster that can favor the players, and their current character gains an additional buff should the monster attack them. The controller player draws an AI card which generally instructs which character the monster will target, what type of attack (the number of dice and the minimum roll they need) and damage that the monster can do, and special moves that may occur if the attack is successful. Successful monster attacks will direct damage to parts of the character (like the head or torso), and the character may be killed by multiple damage to the same body part.

After the monster's turn, all players take a turn, in any order desired. A player can generally move their character and engage once with the monster each turn. A character's attack is determined by their gear and similarly uses dice rolls to determine if a hit is made. On a successful hit or hits, the player draws a Hit Location card(s), describing where on the creature they struck, after which they roll a die to determine if they actually wounded the monster. The Hit Location card may include a trap card that nullifies all other hits and gives the monster an immediate attack, a reaction by the monster on a failure to wound, and/or a special bonus if the player roles a critical success (usually rolling a 10 on a 10-sided dice). Players also have a number of other actions they can take as they progress in the other parts of the game, such as dodging attacks or encouraging disabled teammates to get up at the cost of Survival points.

Turns continue in this manner, usually until the AI deck is exhausted, at which point a further wound will defeat the monster. The players then receive resources (both generic and monster-specific), or other rewards specific to the encounter. Any resources gained can be subsequently used in the Settlement Phase.

 Settlement phase 
The settlement phase comprises many possible actions, such as crafting new Gear (i.e. weapons or armor), a random Settlement Event, adding to the various Settlement Locations, or spending "Endeavors" (a settlement-specific currency gained by those who survived the Showdown Phase) in the hope of gaining other bonuses.  Resources gained from the Showdown Phase factor heavily into this part of the game, as players spend resources to craft new Gear or otherwise add to the settlement.  The players can attempt to discover new abilities that then will be given to characters that return to combat in future rounds. Players that have lost their character in combat can draw up a new character from the members of the settlement. A deck of cards depicts the Settlement Locations which comprise the settlement, and these can be added to as the campaign progresses.   

 Finale  
If the settlement's population reaches zero, the settlement is defeated and the game ends.  Otherwise, as long as there are characters returning from the showdown or waiting at the settlement, the game continues through the three phases for approximately 30 lantern years. If they survive long enough, the survivors must eventually showdown against a powerful creature which can readily wipe out the characters if not properly prepared. If the players can survive this, they are considered to have won the game. Failing to fell this creature is considered to be the end of the game, as the creature will quickly destroy the settlement once the characters are dead.

 Expansions 
The core game can be expanded by additional monsters to hunt, and/or new Gear cards. Each new monster includes the monster's miniature, the monster-specific cards related to the Hunt and Showdown phases, new Gear cards and, in some cases, new Settlement cards associated with that monster. Such monsters are typically introduced by adding new Settlement Events that force the players to fight the monster, tying in with core game events. Each expansion also includes a small rulebook that details its integration into the core game and any new special rules or Story Events.

Expansions from Kickstarter 2012: Dragon King, Dung Beetle Knight, Flower Knight, Gorm, Lion God, Lion Knight, Manhunter, Spidicules, and Sunstalker.

Expansions Post-Kickstarter 2012: Green Knight Armor, Lonely Tree, and Slenderman.

Expansions from Kickstarter 2016: Abyssal Woods, Black Knight, Campaigns of Death, Death Armor, The First Hero, Frogdog, Gryphon, Honeycomb Weaver, Inverted Mountain, Ivory Dragon, Nightmare Ram, Oblivion Mosquito, Pariah, Red Witches, Screaming God, and Silver City.

 Development 
Kingdom Death: Monster was developed by Adam Poots. The initial idea for the game was conceived around 2008 while he was awaiting jury duty and reading through a rulebook for a role-playing game; he believed that he could make its gameplay systems better.  Key to his idea was the use of miniatures for the game, and he put about $10,000 of his own savings into finding freelance artists to design the characters and concept art for the "Kingdom Death" setting and to use 3D printing to produce figurines. Poots ran a small Kickstarter campaign in 2009 to raise about $1700 for the production of one figurine he had planned for the game. By 2010, Poots was working with a European artist who could mass-produce the figures in resin. 

While the miniatures had gained some attention, Poots still wanted to produce a game to go along with them and started to design the game. Poots cites inspiration from HeroQuest and specifically its spinoff, Warhammer Quest, for the mechanics of the game. His prior work experience in web browser-based applications helped ensure the gameplay systems made sense and had the necessary flow. In 2009, he started another Kickstarter campaign to develop the game as an iOS app, but the campaign failed to reach its $10,000 goal. With more of the game mechanics in place, Poots then started a third campaign in November 2012, seeking $35,000 to complete the design and production of the game. The Kickstarter concluded with over $2 million pledged, allowing Poots to develop plans for game expansions. Poots believed that he and his team "over-delivered" on this campaign, making him feel "responsible and humbled" by the support from players, and he started to use the profits from additional sales toward further development and expansion of the game.Kingdom Death: Monster 1.5'''

Poots launched another Kickstarter during the 2016 American Thanksgiving holiday weekend to promote an updated printing of the game, Kingdom Death: Monster 1.5, which included various changes and improvements to the core game as well as new content in the form of sixteen new expansions, to start publishing in 2017. Poots sought $100,000 and offered incentives for existing owners to upgrade their edition to 1.5. The Kickstarter raised $1 million within 19 minutes of going live, the fastest such drive according to Kickstarter's David Gallagher. Within a week, at least $5 million was pledged. During the campaign, Poots announced special expansions that used licensed crossovers from the Pathfinder role-playing system and the video game Hyper Light Drifter. The campaign closed with nearly $12.4 million pledged from 19,264 backers. At its conclusion, Kingdom Death: Monster was the highest earning game-related project funded through Kickstarter to that point.

It was announced on October 12, 2017 in Kickstarter Update 58 that the first wave of rewards from the 2016 Kickstarter would begin to ship to backers on October 13th, 2017 (Friday the 13th).

 Reception Kingdom Death: Monster is considered a boutique board game as the cost of the game runs from US$400 without the added expansions, while other board games typically cost significantly less. Much of this cost is considered reasonable due to the quality of the game's production.

Sam Machkovich of Ars Technica called the game itself "brutal" in the volume of materials shipped with it and the estimated playing time, but believed all these feed into a "four-player co-op adventure of your wildest dreams". The game is noted for having a steep learning curve, making it difficult, and is often compared to the Dark Souls series of video games.

Lillian Cohen-Moore of Bitch noted that much of the art in Kingdom Death: Monster contains overtly sexual poses and looks for the female figurines and artwork in the game, stating that "This scale of female sexualization in Kingdom Death's characterizations outweighs, for me, any other merits this game could have going for it". Poots replied that, as the game is not intended for younger audiences, he did not want to hamper his team of artists, instead allowing them to "bring forth their full potential and feel comfortable exploring a nightmare horror world". Poots stated that Kingdom Death includes pinup poses, inspired by pin-up models of the 1950s and 1960s of both male and female characters, feeling they are appropriate for the mature audiences intended for the game. Charlie Hall of Polygon'' found that some of the imagery within the game's manual and figures was somewhat grotesque and explicit, turning off some players and drawing attention away from the actual game itself, which he otherwise considered "masterful".

References

External links 
 
  (checklist-style fan site)
  (comprehensive fan site)

Cooperative board games
Kickstarter-funded tabletop games
Board games introduced in 2015